Samir Bousenine (born 7 February 1991) is an Andorran international footballer who plays for Inter Club d'Escaldes, as a right winger.

Career
Bousenine has played for FC Andorra, FC Santa Coloma, TF Croix-Daurade, AS Tournefeuille, US Revel, FC Lusitanos, UE Engordany and Inter Club d'Escaldes.

He made his international debut for Andorra in 2010.

References

1991 births
Living people
Andorran footballers
Andorra international footballers
FC Andorra players
FC Santa Coloma players
AS Tournefeuille players
FC Lusitanos players
UE Engordany players
Inter Club d'Escaldes players
Association football wingers
Andorran expatriate footballers
Andorran expatriates in France
Expatriate footballers in France